Aneta Lédlová (born 31 December 1996) is a Czech ice hockey player for AIK IF and the Czech national team.

She participated at the 2016,2017 and 2019 IIHF Women's World Championships. Lédlová outed herself as lesbian.

Career
Note: Does not include current in-progress season per Wikipedia statistics policy.

References

External links

1996 births
Living people
Czech women's ice hockey forwards
People from Kadaň
Czech expatriate ice hockey players in Canada
Czech expatriate ice hockey players in Sweden
Czech expatriate ice hockey players in the United States
Robert Morris Colonials women's ice hockey players
Olympic ice hockey players of the Czech Republic
Ice hockey players at the 2022 Winter Olympics
Czech LGBT sportspeople
Czech lesbians
Lesbian sportswomen
LGBT ice hockey players
Sportspeople from the Ústí nad Labem Region